Ashgabat Futbol Kluby is a Turkmen football club based in Ashgabat. They play in the top division of Turkmenistan football, Ýokary Liga. Their home stadium is Nisa Stadium. The club was first founded in 2006, they finished 3rd in their debut year under famous manager Ali Gurbani, who left the club following the home loss to Turan Dasoguz. After Rahym Gurbanmämmedow took charge, the club clinched their first title in 2007.

History
The first season in the Ýokary Liga FC Ashgabat started under the leadership of coach Ali Gurbani. However, in mid-season, after the defeat of the outsider FC Turan, he was dismissed.

In place of Ali Gurbani came Rahym Kurbanmämmedow, with whom the club won the bronze medal in 2006. The following year Kurbanmämmedow led team to the championship title. The club first won the right to represent Turkmenistan in the 2008 Commonwealth of Independent States Cup, and the third largest Asian club tournament AFC President's Cup.

In July 2008 FC Ashgabat took the Supercup of Turkmenistan, beating by penalties Şagadam FK. At the end of the 2008 season the club won the championship again, also led by coach Kurbanmämmedow.

In 2012 the team took last place in the 2013 Ýokary Liga and continued to perform under the new guidance of Amangylyç Koçumow.

In August 2019 Saýid Seýidow has been appointed as coach of the FC Aşgabat. However, Seýidow was replaced by returning coach Koçumow.

Domestic

Continental

Current squad

Honours
Turkmenistan League (2) 2007, 2008
Turkmenistan Super Cup (1) 2007

Managers
  Amangylyç Koçumow (2016–2019)
  Said Seýidow (2019–2020)
  Döwletmyrat Annaýew (2020-nowadays)

References

 
Football clubs in Turkmenistan
2006 establishments in Turkmenistan
Football clubs in Ashgabat